Nordic combined at the 2020 Winter Youth Olympics took place in Les Tuffes, France.

Medal summary

Medal table

Events

Qualification

Qualification summary

References

External links
Results Book – Nordic Combined

 
Youth Olympics
2020 Winter Youth Olympics events
2020
Nordic combined competitions in France